Jones, also called Jonesy, is a fictional ginger American Shorthair cat from the Alien franchise. He is a ship's cat on the Nostromo, the setting of the first film. Jones is also the protagonist of a book adaptation of Alien titled Jonesy: Nine Lives on the Nostromo.

In Alien, Jones was portrayed by four identical cat actors.

Character biography

In Alien 
Owing to Jones' small size and mass, he comfortably shared a hypersleep capsule with one of the crew members during the Nostromo's long journeys. When the Alien began stalking the ship's occupants, Jones was apparently of little interest to the creature (most likely because his biology made him unsuitable for reproduction) and he survived the incident unscathed. However, he was indirectly responsible for the death of Brett; when the latter pursued Jones through the ship's cargo hold, seeking to catch him so that he would not be accidentally picked up on the motion trackers being used by the crew to hunt the Alien, the cat inadvertently lured him into a room where the Alien was hiding. Jones watched on as the Alien dragged Brett's body into the air shafts.

Ellen Ripley later found Jones and put him in a carry case. At one point, Ripley was forced to abandon Jones to the Alien, but, while the Xenomorph was notably distracted by the cat, it did not attack it. Jones was later recovered and put in hypersleep aboard the Narcissus after escaping with Ripley.

In Aliens 
When the Narcissus docked with the Marion, Jones and Ripley were roused from hypersleep by Hoop and the rest of the crew and found themselves in the midst of another Xenomorph incident. When the human survivors were forced to descend to LV-178 below in order to recover a replacement fuel cell for the Narcissus, Jones stayed aboard the shuttle, safely locked inside with an adequate supply of food left for him by Ripley. When Ripley returned and was put back into hypersleep by Hoop, Jones once again curled up inside his cryotube to sleep for the rest of their return journey to Earth.

Jones died of natural causes off-screen between the events of Aliens and Alien 3.

Reception 
Many fans have been interested in the role that Jones has played in the Alien series, some creating theories about him. Theories include the idea that he is a representation of Ridley Scott because of his role in propelling the story, or that he was helping the Xenomorph kill the crew members of the Nostromo. He has been described as "one of the most beloved cats in horror cinema", as well as "one of the most famous felines of the screen". 

Jones has been called "the true hero of Alien" due to his characterization as a survivor who teaches the human characters of the film valuable lessons. He is also appreciated by fans due to the fact that he is the only major character in the franchise that lived a full and long life, having survived facing the Alien on multiple occasions.

Meghan Cook of Insider listed Jones as one of the top 15 best movie cats of all time, calling him a "survivor". The website Collider has also listed him as one of the best cats in cinema, as well as one of the best animal sidekicks in horror.

References 

Alien (franchise) characters
Fictional cats
Fictional people from the 22nd-century
Film characters introduced in 1979
Male horror film characters